The 15903 / 15904 Dibrugarh–Chandigarh Express is a weekly Express train which connects Chandigarh the capital of Punjab and Haryana in the North with the Tea City of India, Dibrugarh in Assam in the East.

Schedule

RSA – Rake sharing
15929/15930 – Tambaram–Dibrugarh Express

Route & Halts

ASSAM
 
 
 
 
 

NAGALAND
 

WEST BENGAL
 
 
 New Jalpaiguri (Siliguri)

BIHAR
 
 
 
 
 

UTTAR PRADESH
 
 
 
 
 

HARYANA
 

CHANDIGARH

Traction

Diesel Loco Shed, Siliguri-based WDM-3A / WDP-4D/WDP-4 locomotive.
Ghaziabad-based WAP-7/Deen Dayal Upadhyaya Jn based WAP-4 locomotive.

Coach composition

The train has standard ICF rakes with max speed of 110 kmph.

 1 AC II Tier
 4 AC III Tier
 13 Sleeper coaches
 2 General
 2 Second-class Luggage/parcel van

Now this train runs with LHB COACH from DIBRUGARGH to CHANDIGARH via GUWAHATI, NEW JALPAIGURI, KATIHAR, SAMASTIPUR JN (also it is drm office along with rail factory and diesel locomotive maintenance yard), MUZAFFARPUR JN, CHHAPRA JN, GORAKHPUR JN, SAHARANPUR JN.

References

Transport in Dibrugarh
Railway services introduced in 2009
Express trains in India
Rail transport in Assam
Rail transport in Uttar Pradesh
Rail transport in Madhya Pradesh
Rail transport in Haryana
Rail transport in Nagaland
Rail transport in Chandigarh
Rail transport in West Bengal
Rail transport in Bihar